Tachiramantis is a genus of strabomantid frogs. These frogs are endemic to Venezuela and Colombia.

Species
The following species are recognised in the genus Tachiramantis:

Tachiramantis cuentasi 
Tachiramantis douglasi 
Tachiramantis lassoalcalai 
Tachiramantis lentiginosus 
Tachiramantis padrecarlosi 
Tachiramantis prolixodiscus 
Tachiramantis tayrona

References

Amphibians of South America
Endemic fauna of Colombia
Endemic fauna of Venezuela
Amphibian genera
Strabomantidae
Taxa described in 2015